{{DISPLAYTITLE:C27H30O6}}
The molecular formula C27H30O6 (molar mass: 450.52 g/mol, exact mass: 450.2042 u) may refer to:

 Cyclotriveratrylene (CTV)
 Sofalcone

Molecular formulas